The National Counterterrorism Center (NCTC) is a United States government organization responsible for national and international counterterrorism efforts. It is based in Liberty Crossing, a modern complex near Tysons Corner in McLean, Virginia. NCTC advises the United States on terrorism.

Part of the Office of the Director of National Intelligence, the group brings together specialists from other federal agencies, including the CIA, the FBI, the Department of Defense, and the Department of Homeland Security.

In 2012, the United States Attorney General Eric Holder granted the agency the authority to collect, store, and analyze extensive data collections on U.S. citizens compiled from governmental and non-governmental sources for suspicious behavior through pattern analysis and to share the databases with foreign states. The effort has drawn controversy for its pre-crime effort, which has been likened to the Information Awareness Office and its proposed mass surveillance.

History
The precursor organization of NCTC, the Terrorist Threat Integration Center (TTIC), was established on May 1, 2003, by President George W. Bush by Executive Order 13354. President Bush announced the creation of TTIC in his 2003 State of the Union Address. TTIC was established in response to recommendations by the National Commission on Terrorist Attacks Upon the United States (9/11 Commission) that investigated the terrorist attacks on September 11, 2001. Among other things, the 9/11 Commission concluded that "none of the measures adopted by the U.S. government before 9/11 disturbed or even delayed the progress of the al Qaeda plot".

The Intelligence Reform and Terrorism Prevention Act of 2004 renamed TTIC to NCTC and placed it under the United States Director of National Intelligence. It has access to various databases, including those from the NSA and the CIA, and is in charge of the Terrorist Identities Datamart Environment (TIDE) database. It also operates the publicly accessible Worldwide Incidents Tracking System database.

Activities
The center analyzes terrorism intelligence including potential domestic threat intelligence; monitors communications internationally and domestically for potential threats; generates actionable information to potentially prevent criminal acts domestically; stores terrorism information; supports U.S. counterterrorism activities using information technology (IT); and plans counter-terrorism activities as directed by the President of the United States, the National Security Council, and the Homeland Security Council.

In August 2019, The Daily Beast reported that the NTC had begun to work on counterintelligence to combat domestic terrorism.

Goals
Its goals include providing terrorism information to the intelligence community; providing detailed lists of terrorists, terrorist groups, and worldwide terrorist incidents; supporting the response to terrorist incidents in the United States and worldwide; and writing assessments and briefings for policymakers.

After the Christmas 2009 terrorist attempt on Northwest Airlines Flight 253, the NCTC was tasked with creating a process to "thoroughly and exhaustively" prioritize terrorism threat threads; identify follow-up action by intelligence, law enforcement, and homeland security; and enhance the "Terrorist Identities Datamart Environment" database, to add names to watchlists.

Terrorist Identities Datamart Environment
The Terrorist Identities Datamart Environment (TIDE) is a database compiled by the NCTC containing over 1,200,000 identities of individuals suspected of terror links and domestic individuals of interest including the names of known or suspected terrorists as well as those affiliated.

Leadership

Directors
Source:

 John O. Brennan (Interim) (August 27, 2004 – August 1, 2005)
 Vice Admiral (Ret.) John Scott Redd (August 1, 2005 –November 10, 2007)
 Michael E. Leiter (Acting) (November 10, 2007 – June 12, 2008)
 Michael E. Leiter (June 12, 2008 – July 8, 2011)
 Matthew G. Olsen (August 16, 2011 – July 2014)
 Nicholas Rasmussen (December 18, 2014 – December 24, 2017)
 Russell Travers (acting) (December 24, 2017 – December 27, 2018)

 Joseph Maguire (December 27, 2018 – August 15, 2019)
 Russell Travers (acting) (August 16, 2019 – March 18, 2020)
 Lora Shiao (acting) (April 3, 2020 – August 10, 2020)
 Christopher C. Miller (August 10, 2020 – November 9, 2020)
 Steve Vanech (acting) (November 10, 2020 – June 29, 2021)
Christine Abizaid  (June 29, 2021 - Present)

Deputy Directors
 Arthur M. Cummings (2004–05)
 Kevin R. Brock (2005–07)
 Michael E. Leiter (2007–08)
 Geoff O'Connell (2008–2011)
 Andrew Liepman (2011–2012)
 Nicholas J. Rasmussen (2012–2014)
 L. Joseph Camilleri (2016–2017)
 John J. Mulligan
 Lora Shiao (April 2020 – November 2020)
 Steve Vanech (acting) (November 2020 – present)

See also
 Director of Central Intelligence Directive
 Counterterrorism Center
 Information Sharing Environment
 Disposition Matrix
 Joint Terrorism Analysis Centre – a similar body in the UK

References

External links

NCTC Website
Office of the Director of National Intelligence Website
NCTC News Story on Appointment of Michael Leiter and retirement of Kevin Brock
News about new NCTC on FBI website
BBC News article with internal photograph
 A Comparison of the 2008 and 2012 NCTC Guidelines, WSJ

Counterterrorist organizations
United States intelligence agencies
2003 establishments in the United States
Buildings and structures in Fairfax County, Virginia
Counterterrorism in the United States
Government agencies established in 2003
Intelligence analysis agencies